George Mofokeng (born 19 February 1979) is a long-distance runner from South Africa, who twice won the national marathon title in his native country: in 2006 and 2007.

Achievements

External links 

1979 births
Living people
South African male long-distance runners
South African male marathon runners